Bombay halwa, also known as Karachi halwa or Bombay Karachi halwa, is a popular Indian sweet. It is made of corn flour, water, clarified butter or ghee and sugar. Bombay halwa is usually coloured orange, red or green and flavoured with cardamom and ghee. It has a long shelf life.

It originated in Karachi, a city in Pakistan, but was popularised in Mumbai (then Bombay) as both are the port cities and the migrants from Karachi, Pakistan, settled in Mumbai. The sweet was brought to Bombay and was popularized by halwais (sweet makers), who moved from Karachi after the partition of India.

See also 
 Halva
 Turkish delight (similar to Bombay halwa)

References 

Indian confectionery
Culture of Mumbai
Halva